Winterbotham is a surname. Notable people with the surname include:

Arthur Brend Winterbotham (1838–1892), English cloth manufacturer and politician
Arthur Winterbotham (cricketer) (1864–1936), English cricketer
F. W. Winterbotham (1897–1990), World War II British intelligence officer
Henry Selfe Page Winterbotham (1837–1873), English lawyer and politician 
Joseph Winterbotham (1852-1925), American manufacturer and arts patron
Neil Winterbotham, British fashion entrepreneur
Percival Winterbotham (1883–1925), English cricketer
Rue Winterbotham Carpenter (1876-1931), American art collector and philanthropist, daughter of Joseph
Russell R. Winterbotham (1904–1971), American writer
Sam Winterbotham (born 1973), British tennis coach 
William Winterbotham (1763–1829), British Baptist minister and a political prisoner

See also
 Winterbottom